The 1981 Florida Federal Open was a women's tennis tournament played on outdoor hard courts at the East Lake Woodlands Racquet Club in Tampa, Florida in the United States that was part of the Toyota Series circuit of the 1981 WTA Tour and classified as category 4. It was the ninth edition of the tournament and was held from October 5 through October 11, 1981. First-seeded Martina Navratilova won the singles title and earned $22,000 first-prize money.

Finals

Singles
 Martina Navratilova defeated  Bettina Bunge 5–7, 6–2, 6–0
 It was Navratilova's 8th singles title of the year and the 53rd of her career.

Doubles
 Rosie Casals /  Wendy Turnbull defeated  Martina Navratilova /  Renáta Tomanová 6–3, 6–4

Prize money

References

External links
 International Tennis Federation (ITF) tournament edition details

Eckerd Open
Florida Federal Open
Florida Federal Open
20th century in Tampa, Florida
Sports competitions in Tampa, Florida
Florida Federal Open
Florida Federal Open